Derek John Bennett is a Canadian politician, who was elected to the Newfoundland and Labrador House of Assembly in the 2015 provincial election. He represents the electoral district of Lewisporte-Twillingate as a member of the Liberal Party.

He was re-elected in the 2019 provincial election.

Bennett was promoted to cabinet on August 19, 2020 as provincial Minister of Environment, Climate Change, and Municipalities.

He was re-elected in the 2021 provincial election. He was dropped from Cabinet in April 2021. Bennett was elected Speaker of the Newfoundland and Labrador House of Assembly on April 12, 2021, defeating 4 other candidates.

References

Living people
Liberal Party of Newfoundland and Labrador MHAs
Members of the Executive Council of Newfoundland and Labrador
21st-century Canadian politicians
Year of birth missing (living people)